Słupie  is a village in the administrative district of Gmina Bakałarzewo, within Suwałki County, Podlaskie Voivodeship, in the north-east part of Poland.

References

Villages in Suwałki County